Luc Van Acker is a Belgian singer, songwriter, and music producer. He began writing and releasing solo material in 1982, contributed guitar on Shriekback's 1984 album Jam Science, and collaborated with Anna Domino on the track "Zanna" for his 1984 solo album The Ship (released in the United States as Luc Van Acker).

In 1985, he met Richard 23 of Front 242 at the DNA Club in Brussels, Belgium, and thereby became a founding member of Revolting Cocks along with Ministry's Al Jourgensen. He appears on their first three studio albums (Big Sexy Land, Beers, Steers, and Queers, and Linger Ficken Good), and the live album Live! You Goddamned Son of a Bitch.

He produced a mini-LP for Anna Domino in 1986, titled East/West.

In 1989–1991, he was a member of Mussolini Headkick, who released two records including one on the WaxTrax! Records label.

References

Further reading

External links
 lucvanacker.com
 Official fan website
 Biography

Belgian male singers
Living people
Wax Trax! Records artists
Revolting Cocks members
1961 births